Ex Silentio is the Greek early music ensemble, that has a wide repertoire from medieval music up to baroque. Ex Silentio appears regularly in festivals and venues in many European countries and focuses on music from Southern Europe and the Mediterranean as well as on Orient-Occident music relations. Band's first album, Mneme, received the Pizzicato's journal prize and was shortlisted for the International Classical Music Awards in 2016.

History 
Ensemble was founded in 2001 and is specialized in early music and historical performance practice. The director is a flute-player Dimitris Kountouras. Ex Silentio has performed in musical theatre and contemporary dance productions of the Athens Festival and the Athens International Dance Month. They had also performed in festivals and chamber music concert series in Greece and around Europe, including the “Musica antica del Mediterraneo” in Bari, the “Marco Fodella” concert series in Milan, the Greek Institute of Berlin, the “Musica Antiqua da Camera” in the Hague, the summer “Alte Musik in St. Ruprecht” in Vienna, the Μοzaik Project in Albania, the 1st Early Music Festival in Nicosia, at the Athens and Thessaloniki Concert Halls (Megaron), the Athens Festival, the Renaissance Festival in Rethymno, the Festival Guitar Plus, the Music Days of Rhodes etc. Ex Silentio has recorded for the record companies “Talanton” (works by Guillaume Du Fay and 15th-century secular music) and “Carpe Diem” Records (Mneme - Medieval music from the Mediterranean, won the Pizzicato Magazine Supersonic prize, and was shortlisted for the International Classical Music Awards in the Early Music category in 2016). Ex Silentio is based in the Athens Conservatory. Members of the band teach at the international music community “Music Village” in Pelion.

Albums

Mneme (2015) 
The album features cantiga songs by the famous Spanish king-composer Alfonso X. Along with this, a few  instrumental pieces, like the popular dance Saltarello from the London / Tuscan manuscript (an important archive of medieval Italian music), are included. The album also features compositions from the XIV-XV centuries - from Sephardim, Arabs and Greeks.

Lethe (In the Courts of the Orient) (2020) 

Lethe (Greek for "oblivion"), includes El Rey de Francia, a Sephardic ballad in Ladino (also known as The King's Daughter's Dream), The Nisabur and the Bestenigar pesrevs, from the collection of Dimitrie Cantemir (1673-1723), and Murabba, an old Ottoman song included in the collection of Ali Ufki (1610-1675). Mahur semai is a later example of instrumental Ottoman music from the 19th century.

Ensemle members

Main 
 Fanie Antonelou, voice
 Theodora Baka, voice
 Thimios Atzakas, oud
 Elektra Miliadou, fiddle
 Andreas Linos, viol
 Fani Vovoni, violin
 Flora Papadopoulou, harp
 Iason Ioannou, cello
 Markellos Chryssikopoulos, harpsichord & organ
 Dimitris Tigkas, violone & viol
 Nikos Varelas, percussion
 Dimitris Kountouras, direction & recorder/flute

Guest artists 
 Tobias Schlierf, voice & hurdy-gurdy
 Sokratis Sinopoulos, lyre

Discography

References

External links 
 Arts in Greece | Dimitris Kountouras on early music in Greece
 About Mneme in Pizzicato journal
 Info about the latest album, Lethe, including its booklet with lyrics and photos

Early music
Medieval music
Instrumental early music groups
Renaissance music
Baroque music